Come Out is a 1966 piece by American composer Steve Reich. Reich was asked to edit down tape footage into a form of collage for a benefit for the  Harlem Six and Come Out was a byproduct of the collage's production. The Harlem Six were six black youths arrested for a murder of Margit Sugar, a Hungarian refugee, in Harlem in the weeks following the Little Fruit Stand Riot of 1964. Only one of the six was responsible while the lead witness is generally considered the actual perpetrator. Truman Nelson, a civil rights activist and New Yorker who had asked Reich to compose a sound collage that was separate from Come Out, gave him a collection of tapes with recorded voices to use as source material. Nelson agreed to give Reich creative freedom with the tapes that he presented him for the sound collage. Come Out was a loop of four seconds from the more than 70 hours of tapes Nelson presented to Reich.

Analysis 
Reich eventually used the voice of Daniel Hamm, one of the boys involved in the riots but not responsible for the murder; he was nineteen at the time of the recording. At the beginning of the piece, he says, "I had to, like, open the bruise up, and let some of the bruise blood come out to show them" (alluding to how Hamm had punctured a bruise on his own body to convince police that he had been beaten while in jail). The police had not previously dealt with Hamm's injuries since he did not appear seriously wounded and they had beaten him themselves. This marks the first time that a member of the Five-Percent Nation appeared on a published recording.

The full statement is repeated once. Reich re-recorded the fragment "come out to show them" on two channels, which initially play in unison. They quickly slip out of sync to produce a phase shifting effect, characteristic of Reich's early works. Gradually, the discrepancy widens and becomes a reverberation and, later, almost a canon. The two voices then split into four, looped continuously, then eight, until the actual words are unintelligible. The listener is left with only the rhythmic and tonal patterns of the spoken words. Reich says in the liner notes of his album Early Works of using recorded speech as source material that "by not altering its pitch or timbre, one keeps the original emotional power that speech has while intensifying its melody and meaning through repetition and rhythm." The piece is a prime example of process music.

In dance, the piece was used in 1982 by the Belgian choreographer Anne Teresa De Keersmaeker as part of one of her seminal works, Fase, which became a cornerstone of contemporary dance.

The piece was remixed by the Japanese DJ Ken Ishii for the 1999 album Reich Remixed.

References in other recordings 
 Captain Beefheart's song "Moonlight on Vermont," from Trout Mask Replica (1969) included the phrase "come out to show them" repeated several times. GTOs member Miss Pamela witnessed this music being played over and over during the rehearsals of the aforementioned album. Mark Saucier's song notes cite a different meaning for "come out," saying that "somewhere in this section he's clearly singing 'Come out to Sodom, come out to Sodom,'" referring to the "sexual wickedness" of the biblical city of Sodom.
 The quotation from Come Out was sampled at the beginning of the Madvillain song "America's Most Blunted".
 It also appears on the Unkle Bruise Blood remix of Tortoise's song "Djed."
 Camper Van Beethoven performed a cover version of Come Out on its 2004 album New Roman Times.
 The quotation again appears at the beginning of the Maximillian Colby song "New Jello".
 A sample from the quotation is repeatedly looped on the D*Note track "D*Votion".
 A part of the quotation is sampled in the track "Rush" by Prometheus (Benji Vaughan) on his third studio album Spike.
 The track appears on Nicolas Jaar's Resident Advisor 500 Mix, which was recorded in December 2015 in Brooklyn, New York.
 In 2016, DJs Leon Vynehall and Ellen Allien both opened their respective entries in BBC Radio 1's Essential Mix series with a clip from the piece.
 Doug Gillard's "Come out and Show Me" from his album Parade On (2014), contains the eponymous lyrics as well as a reference to Reich's original using the title words in the background of the latter part of the song.
 JPEGMAFIA replicates the line at the beginning of the song "Polly".
 The piece is used in the soundtrack of the film Diane.
 A small section is used in season 1, episode 7 of the TV show Devs.

References

External links 
Blom, Eric, ed. Grove Dictionary of Music and Musicians. 5th edition, hardcover ed. 10 vols. St. Martin's Press, 1954.
Griffiths, Paul. "Grove Dictionary of Music and Musicians" Grove Music Online: the World's Premier Authority on All Aspects of Music. Ed. L Macy. Oxford Univ. Pr. 7 Nov. 2005.
Steve Reich Interview -Gabrielle Zuckerman, July 2002
Bomb Magazine: Steve Reich and Beryl Korot, by Julia Wolfe
Transcription and analysis of Come Out, by Michael Schell

Compositions by Steve Reich
1966 compositions
Process music pieces